The Philadelphia Phillies are a Major League Baseball franchise based in Philadelphia. They play in the National League East division. Also known in their early years as the "Philadelphia Quakers", pitchers for the Phillies have thrown thirteen separate no-hitters in franchise history. A no-hitter is officially recognized by Major League Baseball only "when a pitcher (or pitchers) allows no hits during the entire course of a game, which consists of at least nine innings", though one or more batters "may reach base via a walk, an error, a hit by pitch, a passed ball or wild pitch on strike three, or catcher's interference". No-hitters of less than nine complete innings were previously recognized by the league as official; however, several rule alterations in 1991 changed the rule to its current form.

Of the thirteen no-hitters pitched by Phillies players, three have been won by a score of 6–0, and three by a score of 1–0, more common than any other results. The largest margin of victory in a Phillies no-hitter was ten runs, in a 10–0 win by Chick Fraser. Charlie Ferguson's no-hitter, the first in franchise history, was a 1–0 victory, as were two of the more recent regular season no-hitters, thrown by Kevin Millwood in 2003 and Roy Halladay in 2010. Three pitchers to throw no-hitters for the Phillies have been left-handed: Johnny Lush (in 1906), Terry Mulholland (in 1990) and Cole Hamels (in 2015). The other eight pitchers were right-handed. Halladay is the only Phillies' pitcher to throw more than one no-hitter in a Phillies uniform, and others, including Hall of Famer Jim Bunning, have pitched more than one in their careers. The longest interval between Phillies no-hitters was between the games pitched by Lush and Bunning, encompassing 58 years, 1 month, and 20 days from May 1, 1906 to June 21, 1964. Conversely, the shortest interval between no-hitters was between Halladay's two 2010 no-hitters, with a total of merely four months and seven days from May 29 to October 6; the shortest gap between regular-season no-hitters was between Mulholland's and Tommy Greene's games (nine months and eight days from August 15, 1990 to May 23, 1991). Two opponents have been no-hit by the Phillies more than one time: the San Francisco Giants, who were defeated by Mulholland (in 1990) and Millwood (in 2003); and the Cincinnati Reds, who were no-hit by Rick Wise (in 1971) and Halladay (in 2010).

The umpire is also an integral part of any no-hitter. The task of the umpire in a baseball game is to make any decision "which involves judgment, such as, but not limited to, whether a batted ball is fair or foul, whether a pitch is a strike or a ball, or whether a runner is safe or out… [the umpire's judgment on such matters] is final." Part of the duties of the umpire making calls at home plate includes defining the strike zone, which "is defined as that area over homeplate (sic) the upper limit of which is a horizontal line at the midpoint between the top of the shoulders and the top of the uniform pants, and the lower level is a line at the hollow beneath the kneecap." These calls define every baseball game and are therefore integral to the completion of any no-hitter. A different umpire presided over each of the Phillies' thirteen no-hitters, including Wes Curry, who created Major League Baseball's catcher interference rule.

Two perfect games, a special subcategory of no-hitter, have been pitched in Phillies history. This feat was achieved by Bunning in 1964, which was the first perfect game in the National League since 1880, and Halladay in 2010. As defined by Major League Baseball, "in a perfect game, no batter reaches any base during the course of the game."

On July 25, 2015, Phillies left-hander Cole Hamels threw his first career no-hitter in a 5–0 win over the Chicago Cubs at the historic Wrigley Field. He narrowly missed completing a perfect game by walking two Cubs batters. Odubel Herrera, Phillies centerfielder, nearly dropped the game's final out at the warning track after he overran a long fly ball hit by Cubs rookie sensation Kris Bryant; Herrera, however, was able to snag the ball with an awkward sliding catch to close out the game and preserve Hamels's no-hitter. In addition to this being Cole Hamels's first no-hitter, this was the fourth no hitter caught by longtime Phillies catcher Carlos Ruiz, who now has tied the MLB record for no-hitters caught.

List of Phillies no-hitters

See also

List of Major League Baseball no-hitters

References
General reference

Inline citations

External links
Philadelphia Phillies official website

No-hit
Philadelphia Phillies
No-hit